Poderosas (Will For Revenge) is a portuguese telenovela which began airing on SIC in 18 May 2015 - 20 May 2016.

Plot 
MARINA NOGUEIRA, 55, business woman, leader of the company "Chão de Portugal" and JOSÉ MARIA SOUSA E ATAÍDE, 56, sports manager, decided to get engaged. At first the romance is kept in secrecy with the exception of AMÉLIA HENRIQUES, 38, Marina’s new assistant, that has, herself also a strong reason to get revenge from José Maria and will lead all the action at this new and strong novella. When Marina decides to introduce Jose Maria to her friends and family, she faces a strong opposition from her only daughter, LUÍSA NOGUEIRA, 28, that doesn’t understand how could her mother find love again so shortly after her father’s death 2 years ago. Luísa’s brother, GONÇALO NOGUEIRA, 20 , doesn’t take a stand. HOMERO SOUSA E ATAÍDE, 75, and MIGUEL SOUSA E ATAÍDE, 35, father and brother of Jose Maria, are thrilled with the idea of seeing Jose marrying such a successful woman, owner of a huge company. They 3 conspire. Together with Luísa and Amélia, another woman JACINTA LOURENÇO, 48, Marina’s friend, also has a strong resentment that comes from the past. The 3 are determined to get revenge of José Maria.

Cast

References

2015 Portuguese television series debuts
2016 Portuguese television series endings
Portuguese telenovelas
2015 telenovelas
Sociedade Independente de Comunicação telenovelas
Portuguese-language telenovelas